

Ward Hill  is a locality in the Australian state of South Australia located on the west coast of Yorke Peninsula immediately adjoining Spencer Gulf about  north-west of the Adelaide city centre.

Its boundaries were created in October 1998 for the “long established name” and included the Webling Bay Shack Area.  The name was derived from the hill now located within the locality.  Its coastline with Spencer Gulf includes at its northern end, an inlet known as Mundoora Arm and a channel known as Hamilton Lagoons.

As of 2015, land within the locality was zoned for agriculture while a strip of land along its coastline was zoned for conservation.

Ward Hill is located within the federal division of Grey, the state electoral district of Narungga and the local government area of the District Council of Barunga West.

See also
Ward Hill (disambiguation)

References

Towns in South Australia
Yorke Peninsula